James Joseph Cooney (July 9, 1865 – July 1, 1903) was a shortstop in Major League Baseball who played from  through  for the Chicago Colts (1890–92) and Washington Senators (1892) of the National League. Listed at 5' 9", 155 lb. Cooney batted switch and threw right-handed. He was born in Cranston, Rhode Island.  
 
In a three-season career, Cooney was a .242 hitter (315-for-1302) with four home runs and 118 RBI in 324 games, including 35 doubles, 14 triples, and 77 stolen bases.

Cooney's sons Jimmy and Johnny also played in the Major Leagues. Cooney died at the age of 37 in his hometown of Cranston of pneumonia, and is interred at the St. Ann Cemetery there.

See also
List of second-generation Major League Baseball players

References

External links

Retrosheet

1865 births
1903 deaths
Sportspeople from Cranston, Rhode Island
Baseball players from Rhode Island
Major League Baseball shortstops
Chicago Colts players
Washington Senators (1891–1899) players
19th-century baseball players
Minor league baseball managers
Bridgeport Giants players
Haverhill (minor league baseball) players
Oshkosh (minor league baseball) players
Omaha Omahogs players
Omaha Lambs players
Providence Grays (minor league) players
Providence Clamdiggers (baseball) players
Bristol Bellmakers players

 Jimmy Cooney at SABR (Baseball BioProject)